New Brunswick Route 8 is a major highway in the province of New Brunswick, Canada.

Route description 

Route 8 begins at Trans-Canada Highway 2 in Fredericton. It uses the old alignment of the TCH between there and Route 7 before heading north on the Princess Margaret Bridge.

After a roundabout with Route 105, Route 8 becomes a two-lane limited access highway. First named the Barkers Point Bypass, it becomes the Marysville Bypass following the intersection with Route 10.

After the Marysville Bypass, Route 8 generally follows the Southwest Miramichi River up until Miramichi, where it has an overlap with Route 11 on the Centennial Bridge before heading north on its own as a two-lane expressway, later ending at Route 11 in Bathurst.

History 

Route 8 was one of the original New Brunswick routes in the 1920s. Its route saw little changes until bypasses were constructed in the Fredericton area in the 1980s and 1990s. It would also see an extension south on part of the old Trans-Canada Highway 2 bypass of Fredericton in 2001.

In 2006, Route 8 was realigned on a two-lane bypass of part of Newcastle in Miramichi.

On January 12, 2008, a van carrying the basketball team from Bathurst High School collided with a semi-trailer truck on Route 8 near Bathurst, killing eight and injuring four. This prompted the government of New Brunswick to ban the use of 15-passenger vans for student transport.

Marysville Bypass 

A bypass for the Fredericton suburbs of Marysville and South Portage, north of Taymouth, was started in 2007 before officially opening August 26, 2014. The old alignment of Route 8 became Route 148 upon completion of the bypass.

Major intersections 
From south to north:

See also
List of New Brunswick provincial highways

References

008
008
008
008
Transport in Bathurst, New Brunswick
Transport in Fredericton
Transport in Miramichi, New Brunswick